Tropical Storm Pabuk, also referred to as Cyclonic Storm Pabuk, was a weak storm that struck the Malay Peninsula in January 2019. It was also the earliest-forming storm in both the Northwestern Pacific Ocean and North Indian Ocean basins on record. Forming on the last day of 2018, Pabuk persisted into 2019, spanning two calendar years, and crossed into the North Indian Ocean basin several days later. The first tropical cyclone and named storm of the 2019 Pacific typhoon and North Indian Ocean cyclone seasons, Pabuk originated as a tropical disturbance in the South China Sea on December 28, 2018, which organized into a tropical depression on December 31. A day later, on January 1, 2019, the system intensified into a tropical storm and was named Pabuk. Pabuk made landfall in Thailand on January 4, emerging into the Bay of Bengal in the North Indian Ocean basin shortly afterward. Pabuk weakened after it entered the North Indian Ocean, eventually degenerating into a remnant low on January 7, before dissipating on the next day.

Pabuk killed a total of 10 people, and the storm caused an estimated total of US$157 million in damages. In Thailand, eight people were killed and the economic losses were estimated at $156 million. Pabuk also caused one death each in Vietnam and Malaysia.

Meteorological history

A tropical disturbance formed over the southern portion of the South China Sea on December 28, 2018, absorbing the remnants of Tropical Depression 35W (Usman) on December 30. Under high vertical wind shear, the low-pressure area remained disorganized until December 31 when it was upgraded to a tropical depression by both the JMA and the JTWC. As it was designated 36W by the JTWC, it was unofficially the last system of the 2018 typhoon season. At around 06:00 UTC on January 1, 2019, the system was upgraded to the first tropical storm of the 2019 typhoon season and was named Pabuk by the JMA, surpassing Typhoon Alice in 1979 to become the earliest-forming tropical storm in the northwest Pacific Ocean on record. At that time, Pabuk was about 650 km (405 miles) southeast of Ho Chi Minh City, Vietnam and drifted westward slowly with a partially exposed low-level circulation center.

Under marginal conditions, including warm sea surface temperatures, excellent poleward outflow but strong vertical wind shear, Pabuk struggled to intensify further for another two days until it accelerated west-northwestward and entered the Gulf of Thailand on January 3, where vertical wind shear was slightly weaker. This made Pabuk the first tropical storm to exist in the gulf since Muifa in 2004. Around that time, the storm tried to form an eye, which was revealed by microwave imagery. On January 4, the Thai Meteorological Department reported that Pabuk had made landfall over Pak Phanang, Nakhon Si Thammarat at 12:45 ICT (05:45 UTC), although other agencies indicated a landfall at peak intensity between 06:00 and 12:00 UTC. Pabuk became the first tropical storm to make landfall over southern Thailand since Linda in 1997. Shortly after 12:00 UTC, the JMA issued its last full advisory for Pabuk, as the storm exited the basin into the North Indian Ocean.

Soon after Pabuk crossed over into the basin, the IMD initiated advisories on the storm, making Pabuk the earliest-forming cyclonic storm for this basin, surpassing Hibaru in 2005, as well as the first cyclonic storm with a name originally assigned by RSMC Tokyo.

Impact

In Vietnam, Pabuk resulted in the death of one person. The storm also caused an estimated ₫27.87 billion (US$1.2 million) in damages in the country. Elsewhere, many people were forced to evacuate coastal areas of Thailand. In Bangkok, rain and storm surge flooded roads in the large city, and there was reports of major wind damage by nightfall, with many trees downed. Pabuk killed 8 people in Thailand, including one Russian tourist; 3 of the victims were killed by flying debris and the storm surge. Pabuk's damage in Thailand were estimated to be 5 billion bahts (US$156 million). Pabuk killed one person by drowning in Malaysia.

See also

Weather of 2018 and 2019
Tropical cyclones in 2019
Other tropical cyclones named Pabuk
Typhoon Gay (1989)
Cyclone Matmo–Bulbul
Cyclone Forrest
Tropical Storm Linda (1997)
Tropical Storm Vamei
Typhoon Durian
Cyclone Jal
Tropical depressions Wilma and BOB 05

References

External links
 Weather Underground Tropical Storm Pabuk track data

Pabuk
P
Pabuk
Pabuk
Pabuk
Pabuk
2019 in Thailand
2019 in Malaysia
2019 in Myanmar